Guadalupe Maravilla, formerly known as Irvin Morazan, is a transdisciplinary visual artist, choreographer, and healer.

At the age of eight, Maravilla was part of the first wave of unaccompanied minors, undocumented children to arrive at the United States border in the 1980s as a result of the Salvadoran Civil War. In 2016, Maravilla became a U.S. citizen and adopted the name Guadalupe Maravilla in solidarity with his undocumented father, who uses Maravilla as his last name. With regards to his first name, his mother, who died with cancer in 2007, told him how she initially wanted to name him Guadalupe, since he was born on the same day as the Virgin of Guadalupe. However, she didn't because his father wanted him to have a more masculine name. As an acknowledgement of his own migratory past, Maravilla grounds his practice in the historical and contemporary contexts of immigrant culture, particularly those belonging to Latinx communities.

Combining pre-colonial Central American ancestry, personal mythology, and collaborative performative acts, Maravilla’s performances, objects, and drawings trace the history of his own displacement and that of others. Culling the entangled fictional and autobiographical genealogies of border crossing accounts, Maravilla nurtures collective narratives of trauma into celebrations of perseverance and humanity. Across all media, Maravilla explores how the systemic abuse of immigrants physically manifests in the body, reflecting on his own battle with cancer, which began in his gut.  Maravilla’s large-scale sculptures, titled Disease Throwers, function as headdresses, instruments, and shrines through the incorporation of materials collected from sites across Central America, anatomical models, and sonic instruments such as conch shells and gongs. Disease Throwers ultimately serve as symbols of renewal, generating therapeutic, vibrational sound.

Maravilla's studio is located in Brooklyn, New York.  He is currently a Professor of Practice in the School of the Museum of Fine Arts at Tufts University.

Education 
He earned his Bachelors of Fine Arts degree from the School of Visual Arts in New York in 2003.  He earned his Master of Fine Arts degree from Hunter College in New York in 2013.

Performances 
Maravilla has performed in many venues including the Whitney Museum of American Art, New York; the Museum of Modern Art, New York; the Metropolitan Museum of Art, New York; the Institute of Contemporary Art, Miami; Queens Museum, New York; The Bronx Museum of the Arts, New York; El Museo del Barrio, New York; Museum of Art of El Salvador, San Salvador; X Central American Biennial, Costa Rica; New York;, Shelley & Donald Rubin Foundation, New York; and the Drawing Center, New York, among others.

Collections 

Maravilla's work has entered the permanent collections of many museums. These include the Museum of Modern Art, New York; the Whitney Museum of American Art, New York; Museo Nacional Centro de Arte Reina Sofía, Madrid; and the Institute of Contemporary Art, Miami.

Prizes 

Maravilla has won many prizes for his art. The 2021 Joan Mitchell Fellowship, the Lise Wilhelmsen Art award 2021, Guggenheim Foundation Fellowship (2019), LatinX Fellowship (a joint prize from the Ford Foundation and Mellon Foundation) (2021), Soros Fellowship: Art Migration and Public Space (2019), Map fund (2019), Creative Capital Grant (2016), Franklin Furnace (2018), Joan Mitchell Emerging Artist Grant (2016), Art Matters Grant (2013), Art Matters Fellowship (2017), Virginia Museum of Fine Arts Fellowship (2018), Dedalus Foundation Grant (2013), Robert Mapplethorpe Foundation Award (2003).

References 

20th-century American artists
21st-century American artists
Salvadoran American
Hunter College alumni
Tufts University faculty
School of Visual Arts alumni
21st-century American sculptors
20th-century American sculptors
1976 births
Living people